Ria Dawn Percival (born 7 December 1989) is a New Zealand professional women's footballer who plays as a defensive midfielder for Tottenham Hotspur in the FA WSL and the New Zealand national team. She previously played for FFC Frankfurt and FF USV Jena of the Bundesliga, FC Basel in the Swiss league and West Ham United.

International
Percival represented New Zealand at age group level, appearing at the 2006 Women's U-20 World Cup finals in Russia and again represented the young ferns at the 2008 Women's U-20 World Cup in Chile, where she scored both of New Zealand's goals in their 3–2 loss to Nigeria.

Percival made her senior debut in a 0–3 loss to China PR on 14 November 2006, before representing New Zealand at the 2007 FIFA Women's World Cup finals in China, where they lost to Brazil 0–5, Denmark (0–2) and China PR (0–2).

Percival was also included in the New Zealand squad for the 2008 Summer Olympics, again in China, where they drew with Japan (2–2) before losing to Norway (0–1) and the United States (0–4).

On 9 March 2011, Percival earned her 50th A-level international cap in a 5–0 loss to Mexico in the play-off for 7th place at the Cyprus Cup.

Percival contested her fifth major tournament when she appeared in all three of New Zealand's matches at the 2011 FIFA Women's World Cup in Germany.  She appeared in all four of New Zealand's games at the 2012 Summer Olympics.

She again featured in all three of New Zealand's matches at the 2015 FIFA Women's World Cup in Canada, taking her to a tally of 9 World Cup matches.  She appeared in all three of New Zealand's games at the 2016 Summer Olympics.

Career statistics

International goals
Updated 28 June 2020

Honours
Individual
 IFFHS OFC Best Woman Player of the Decade 2011–2020
 IFFHS OFC Woman Team of the Decade 2011–2020

References

External links
 
 Profile at NZF
 Team  at FF USV Jena
 

1989 births
Living people
New Zealand women's association footballers
Olympic association footballers of New Zealand
Footballers at the 2008 Summer Olympics
Footballers at the 2012 Summer Olympics
1. FFC Frankfurt players
FF USV Jena players
Expatriate women's footballers in Germany
Expatriate women's footballers in Switzerland
Expatriate women's footballers in England
New Zealand expatriate sportspeople in Germany
New Zealand expatriate sportspeople in Switzerland
New Zealand expatriate sportspeople in England
2007 FIFA Women's World Cup players
2011 FIFA Women's World Cup players
2015 FIFA Women's World Cup players
People from Brentwood, Essex
Women's association football defenders
New Zealand women's international footballers
FIFA Century Club
Footballers at the 2016 Summer Olympics
F.C. Indiana players
Expatriate women's soccer players in the United States
New Zealand expatriate sportspeople in the United States
2019 FIFA Women's World Cup players
Tottenham Hotspur F.C. Women players
Footballers at the 2020 Summer Olympics
New Zealand expatriate women's association footballers
New Zealand expatriate sportspeople in Canada
Expatriate women's soccer players in Canada
Ottawa Fury (women) players